Romain Guessagba-Sato-Lebel (born March 2, 1981), generally known as Romain Sato, is a former Central African professional basketball player. Standing at a height of 1.96 m (6' 5"), he played as a swingman.

High school
Sato attended Dayton Christian High School, while living in Moraine, Ohio, in the United States. While there, he played basketball, and in 2000 Sato was selected as Mr. Basketball for the state of Ohio. In 2019 he was elected to the Dayton Christian High School Athletic Hall of Fame, and in 2021 the school retired his #23 jersey.

College career
Sato graduated from Xavier University in 2004, having majored in French, after playing college basketball with the Xavier Musketeers.

Professional career
Sato was selected by the San Antonio Spurs in the 2004 NBA draft, and was subsequently waived on February 24, 2005. After being drafted by the Spurs, Sato played in the Italian Second Division with Sicc Cucine Jesi. He was the league's second-leading scorer in the 2005–06 season, averaging 25.5 points per game, and also adding 7.5 rebounds per game.

In Romain's three playoff games that season, he averaged 35 points and 14.6 rebounds. From there, he went to FC Barcelona to play in the 2006 Spanish ACB League playoffs. Sato then returned to Italy to play in the top Italian League with Montepaschi Siena for the 2006–07 season. In his first season with Siena, he helped Montepaschi to win the Scudetto (Italian Championship), and he then went on to win three more Scudetti with Siena. He was named the Italian League MVP in 2010.

In July 2010, he signed a three-year contract with Panathinaikos. In the summer of 2012, he signed a two-year contract with Fenerbahçe Ülker.  He left them after one season. In August 2012, he signed a one-year deal with the Spanish team Valencia Basket. On July 1, 2014, he re-signed with Valencia Basket for two more years.

National team career
Sato played with the senior men's Central African Republic national basketball team at the 2009 FIBA Africa Championship. He averaged 21.6 points and 8.6 rebounds per game at the tournament, and was named to the All-Tournament First Team.

Career statistics

EuroLeague

|-
| style="text-align:left;"| 2007–08
| style="text-align:left;"| Montepaschi Siena
| 23 || 22 || 28.0 || .442 || .347 || .731 || 4.9 || 1.0 || 1.8 || .1 || 11.6 || 12.7
|-
| style="text-align:left;"| 2008–09
| style="text-align:left;"| Montepaschi Siena
| 20 || 19 || 25.8 || .462 || .400 || .814 || 3.9 || .7 || 1.8 || .1 || 10.1 || 10.8
|-
| style="text-align:left;"| 2009–10
| style="text-align:left;"| Montepaschi Siena
| 16 || 16 || 28.0 || .490 || .396 || .855 || 5.3 || 1.3 || 1.5 || .0 || 13.6 || 16.3
|-
| style="text-align:left;background:#AFE6BA;"| 2010–11†
| style="text-align:left;"| Panathinaikos
| 21 || 16 || 26.2 || .413 || .388 || .813 || 3.9 || 1.1 || .7 || .1 || 9.0 || 10.1
|-
| style="text-align:left;"| 2011–12
| style="text-align:left;"| Panathinaikos
| 23 || 20 || 26.0 || .410 || .347 || .712 || 4.7 || 1.0 || .7 || .4 || 7.1 || 8.6
|-
| style="text-align:left;"| 2012–13
| style="text-align:left;"| Fenerbahçe Ülker
| 23 || 23 || 27.0 || .408 || .341 || .810 || 4.2 || 1.3 || .7 || .1 || 7.3 || 8.2
|-
| style="text-align:left;"| 2014–15
| style="text-align:left;"| Valencia Basket
| 9 || 6 || 27.3 || .362 || .292 || .800 || 4.8 || 1.1 || .9 || .6 || 6.3 || 6.7
|- class="sortbottom"
| style="text-align:left;"| Career
| style="text-align:left;"|
| 126 || 122 || 26.8 || .433 || .364 || .789 || 4.4 || 1.1 || 1.2 || .2 || 9.4 || 10.6

Gallery

References

External links

 Romain Sato at acb.com 
 Romain Sato at draftexpress.com
 Romain Sato at esake.gr 
 Romain Sato at espn.com
 Romain Sato at euroleague.net
 Romain Sato at fiba.com
 Romain Sato at legabasket.it 
 Romain Sato at mistilynn.com
 Romain Sato at tblstat.net

1981 births
Living people
Articles containing video clips
Central African Republic expatriate basketball people in Spain
Central African Republic men's basketball players
Central African Republic expatriate basketball people in Greece
Central African Republic expatriate basketball people in Italy
Central African Republic expatriate basketball people in Turkey
Central African Republic expatriate basketball people in the United States
FC Barcelona Bàsquet players
Fenerbahçe men's basketball players
Greek Basket League players
Liga ACB players
Mens Sana Basket players
Panathinaikos B.C. players
People from Montgomery County, Ohio
People from Ombella-M'Poko
San Antonio Spurs draft picks
Shooting guards
Small forwards
Valencia Basket players
Xavier Musketeers men's basketball players